The 2016 MLS Expansion Draft was a special draft for the Major League Soccer expansion teams Atlanta United FC and Minnesota United FC.  Atlanta United was selected to pick first by an "Expansion Priority Draft" conducted on October 16, 2016. Protected rosters are based on an MLS release from December 12, 2016.

Format
These are the rules for the 2016 MLS Expansion Draft as laid out by Major League Soccer.

 Existing teams are allowed to protect 11 players from their Senior, Supplemental and Reserve Roster. Generation Adidas players and Homegrown Players on supplemental rosters are automatically protected and exempt from the expansion draft. Though players who graduated from the Generation Adidas program to the senior roster at the end of the 2016 season are not exempt.
 Only one player may be claimed from each club’s non-protected roster, that team is then eliminated from the expansion draft and not allowed to lose any further players
 The expansion draft will last 5 rounds totaling 10 players to be drafted.

Expansion Draft order

Affected Post-Draft Trades
 Minnesota United FC traded Chris Duvall to Montreal Impact for Johan Venegas and allocation money.
 Atlanta United FC traded Donny Toia to Orlando City SC for the #8 pick in the 2017 MLS SuperDraft.
 Atlanta United FC returned Clint Irwin to Toronto FC for Mark Bloom and allocation money.
 Minnesota United FC traded Jeff Attinella to Portland Timbers FC for their natural Second Round Pick in the 2018 MLS SuperDraft and the MLS Rights to Miguel Ibarra.
 Minnesota United FC returned Femi Hollinger-Janzen to the New England Revolution for Bobby Shuttleworth.
 Minnesota United FC traded Saeid to Colorado Rapids.

Team-by-team-breakdown

Chicago Fire

Colorado Rapids

Columbus Crew SC

D.C. United

FC Dallas

Houston Dynamo

LA Galaxy

Montreal Impact

New England Revolution

New York City FC

New York Red Bulls

Orlando City SC

Philadelphia Union

Portland Timbers

Real Salt Lake

San Jose Earthquakes

Seattle Sounders FC

Sporting Kansas City

Toronto FC

Vancouver Whitecaps FC

References

Major League Soccer Expansion Draft
MLS Expansion Draft